Herb(ert) Mitchell may refer to:

 Herb Mitchell (actor) (1937–2011), American actor, director and teacher
 Herb Mitchell (ice hockey) (1895–1969), ice hockey player
Herbert Mitchell (athlete), Footer US NC 800m Men

See also
Bert Mitchell (disambiguation)